Guren is a Japanese word, which means "crimson-colored lotus" and is used in an artistic connotation.

Guren may also refer to:

Guren Onna, a 2008 Japanese TV series 
Gurren Lagann, a 2007 Japanese mecha anime television series
Guren Graduate Institute in Ulaanbaatar, Mongolia
Miloslav Gureň (born 1976), Czech professional ice hockey defenseman
"Guren" (song), a single by The Gazette
Guren, an anime-only character in the Naruto: Shippuden anime-only arc, the Three-Tails Arc.